Chhote Sarkar (translation: Little Prince) is a 1996 Bollywood romantic thriller film directed by Vimal Kumar and written by S. Khan & Naeem-Ejaz The film starred Govinda and Shilpa Shetty. It is inspired from Sanjeev Kumar thriller suspense movie Anhonee.

Plot 

Amar Saxena is a businessman, and the managing director of prestigious Khaitan Fans Ltd., India. One day while leaving from a board meeting, he meets a beggar named Jagmohan, who calls him Rohit, and asks him to return home to his ailing wife, Seema. Amar denies being Rohit, but feels sorry for him and gives him some money, which Jagmohan declines to accept. Curious at his refusal, Amar offers to help. He visits the hospital and gets to meet Seema, and ends up falling in love with her. What he does not know that Jagmohan and Seema are plainclothes police officers, who have been assigned to arrest him for the murder of Ram Kumar Saxena, Amar's uncle. Using his wits, Amar manages to convince the Court that he is of unsound mind, and thus escapes being imprisoned, and ends up in an asylum. From here Amar must stock of his life, and figure out who has framed him for a murder he did not commit, and why Seema and Jagmohan were so intent to incriminate him.

Cast
Govinda as Amar Saxena / Rohit
Shilpa Shetty as Inspector Seema Bedi
Divya Dutta as Meena (Lobo's sister)
Aruna Irani as Amar's aunt
Sadashiv Amrapurkar as Dr. Khanna (Amar's family doctor)
Kader Khan as Commissioner Jagmohan / ACP Chandra Bedi
Aasif Sheikh as Photographer Lobo
Tej Sapru as Beera (Dr. Khanna's Henchman) 
Avtar Gill as Ram Kumar Saxena
Dinesh Hingoo as Cop
Guddi Maruti as Doctor
Mehmood Jr. as Asylum inmate (as Jr. Mehmood)
Gurbachan Singh as Goon at Swimming Pool

Songs
"Ek Chumma Tu Mujhko Udhar Dede Aur Badle Me" - Udit Narayan, Alka Yagnik
"Socho Na Zara Yeh Socho Na Bolo Na Sanam" - Udit Narayan, Alka Yagnik
"Ek Naya Asmaan Aa Gaye Do Dil Jahan" - Kumar Sanu, Alka Yagnik
"Mujhe Dil Ka Rog Laga Ke Tan Man Ke Taar Hilake" - Alka Yagnik
"Mai Aaya Hu Jaha Se Vo Bada Uccha Gharana Hai" - Bali Brahmabhatt
"Ladki Pataa Le Bahuva Kahi Mauka" - Vinod Rathod, Alka Yagnik

References

External links
 

1996 films
1990s mystery films
1996 romantic drama films
1990s Hindi-language films
Films scored by Anand–Milind
Films about dysfunctional families
Films about miscarriage of justice
Films directed by Vimal Kumar
Indian romantic thriller films